Yuliana Elizabeth Angulo Jama (born 6 July 1994) is an Ecuadorian sprinter. She competed in the women's 4 × 100 metres relay at the 2017 World Championships in Athletics. She competed at the 2020 Summer Olympics.

References

External links
 

1994 births
Living people
Ecuadorian female sprinters
World Athletics Championships athletes for Ecuador
Place of birth missing (living people)
South American Games bronze medalists for Ecuador
South American Games medalists in athletics
Competitors at the 2014 South American Games
Athletes (track and field) at the 2019 Pan American Games
Pan American Games competitors for Ecuador
Athletes (track and field) at the 2020 Summer Olympics
Olympic athletes of Ecuador
21st-century Ecuadorian women